Phaedra Ellis-Lamkins (born 1976) is an American social justice advocate and businesswoman.

Ellis-Lamkins is the co-founder and CEO of Promise, a California-based company reworking the bail system. Prior to this, she served as the Head of Care at Honor, the CEO of the anti-poverty organization Green For All, and the Executive Officer of the South Bay AFL–CIO Labor Council, an organized labor federation representing more than 100 unions and more than 110,000 members in California's Santa Clara and San Benito counties.  She was also Executive Director of Working Partnerships USA, a coalition of community groups, and labor and faith organizations working to address economic disparities in California's Silicon Valley.

Early career
After graduating from California State University, Northridge in 1998, Ellis-Lamkins became a union organizer with SEIU Local 715 in San Jose. Following a campaign to secure union representation for home health care workers and other low-income employees, Ellis-Lamkins joined the staff of Working Partnerships USA as the group's education coordinator. She led the Labor/Community Leadership Institute and created its first senior fellows program. In this capacity Ellis-Lamkins created the Faith in Action training program for area clergy and lay leaders.  Within five years, she was running Working Partnerships USA.

She also became the Executive Director of the South Bay AFL-CIO Labor Council, a labor federation representing more than 100 unions in Santa Clara and San Benito counties, and more than 110,000 union members.

As the leader of Working Partnerships USA, Ellis-Lamkins expanded the nation's first county-based universal children's health insurance program to cover more than 160,000 children.  Thirty other counties have replicated this program throughout California.  Ellis-Lamkins also led the fight to create one of the first community benefits agreements in the country, which provided community standards for a large-scale economic development project in San Jose.  Working Partnerships was also successful in expanding the living wage under Ellis-Lamkins leadership. Working Partnerships raised $6 million in grants during its first six-years of operation and achieved policy successes at the local level while attracting criticism for the non-profit’s financial ties to the electoral activities of the South Bay Labor Council.

In 2003, Ellis-Lamkins led the launch of Partnership for Working Families, a national coalition "dedicated to building power and reshaping the economy and urban environment for workers and communities."

Green For All
Ellis-Lamkins joined Green For All as Chief Executive Officer in March 2009.

One of her first initiatives after taking over Green For All was to build a coalition of "a broad range of groups — many of whom are not known for their engagement in climate and energy issues."  This coalition came together to advocate for equity-based amendments to the American Clean Energy and Security Act of 2009 (ACES) — the climate bill in the House of Representatives.  The coalition declared success when the entire House of Representatives approved a version of ACES that included $860 million for green job training and a provision guaranteeing local workers access to ACES-funded energy-efficiency and renewable energy projects.  Green For All describes these as "the Act’s only provisions creating opportunity for low-income people and people of color."

Under Ellis-Lamkins's leadership, Green For All has also won significant policy victories in Washington State and New Mexico.  New Mexico created "green jobs training programs with a focus on rural, tribal communities and disadvantaged individuals" and incentives for green companies to relocate to New Mexico.  Green For All describes the Washington legislation on its website:

The Act puts Washington on the path to weatherize, and otherwise make more energy efficient, 100,000 buildings over the next five years.  This will reduce energy costs, create thousands of quality new jobs, and obviate any potential need for new electricity-generating facilities.  The Act also guarantees access to these jobs for veterans, members of the National Guard, and low-income and disadvantaged populations.
Green For All partnered with the city of Portland, Oregon, on cutting edge use of Recovery Act funds.  The Portland project will create thousands of clean energy jobs for low-income workers, weatherize 100,000 homes, and launch the first model of paying for home weatherization through utility bills.

Ellis-Lamkins has also spearheaded two new campaigns at Green For All.  The Capital Access Program, focused on the private sector, "engages businesses and nonprofits - large and small - to create, sustain, and scale green jobs."  Green the Block, a campaign of both Green For All and Hip Hop Caucus, is a national effort "aimed at helping low-income communities of color become driving forces of the clean-energy economy."

Prince
Ellis-Lamkins became the manager for the musician Prince in 2014. Under her management Prince performed a number of concerts to promote social justice causes, including one in Baltimore in honor of Freddie Gray, a man killed by Baltimore police.

Ellis-Lamkins is credited with winning Prince's life-long battle to secure ownership of his masters. Van Jones described that occasion as "the happiest I have ever seen him."

Honor
In 2015 Ellis-Lamkins joined Honor, Inc. as their Head of Care. Honor is a San Francisco-based technology start up that helps people secure in-home health care professionals.

Awards and recognition
"Spur" awarded Phaedra Ellis-Lamkins the "2018 Silver Spur Awards"  San Jose Magazine named Ellis-Lamkins one of the 100 most powerful people in Silicon Valley. The Silicon Valley Business Journal called her one of “40 to watch under 40.”  In 2009, Ellis-Lamkins received the Visionary Leadership Award for her work as executive officer of the Labor Council and executive director of Working Partnerships USA.

Other activities
Ellis-Lamkins is an alumna of American Leadership Forum.  She has served on the boards of the Progressive Technology Project, New World Foundation, the Women's Fund of Silicon Valley, the City of San Jose General Plan Update Task Force and the Central Labor Council Advisory Committee.  Currently, she serves on the board of the Leadership Council of California Forward and is Chair and Co-Founder of the Partnership for Working Families. Ellis-Lamkins also served as Chair of the Board of Team San Jose, a collaboration to ensure that San Jose's Convention Center is effectively managed to reduce costs and improve the local economy.

References

Living people
Sustainability advocates
American anti-poverty advocates
1976 births